Bensington may refer to:

 The Battle of Bensington, a major battle between Offa's Mercia and the West Saxons in 779 AD
 The former name of Benson, Oxfordshire, England, a village where the battle possibly took place